Huayi may refer to:

Overseas Chinese, or Huayi, people of Chinese birth or descent who live outside China
Huayi Brothers, Chinese entertainment and record company 
Hua-Yi distinction,  ancient Chinese conception that differentiated a culturally defined "China" from cultural or ethnic outsiders